Marcos Palmeira de Paula (born 19 August 1963) is a Brazilian actor, TV host and producer. He is nephew of the siblings Chico Anysio and Lupe Gigliotti.
In 2013, he was nominated for an International Emmy Award for best actor for his role in the series Mandrake.

Works

Telenovelas 
 2022 - Pantanal - José Leôncio
 2019 - A Dona do Pedaço - Amadeu
 2017 - Os Dias Eram Assim - Toni
 2016 - Velho Chico  - Cícero
 2013 - O Canto da Sereia - Agostinho Matoso
 2012 - Cheias de Charme - Sandro
 2009 - Cama de Gato - Gustavo Brandão
 2008 - Três Irmãs - Bento Rio Preto
 2006 - Belíssima - Gilberto Moura
 2003 - Celebridade - Fernando Amorim
 2002 - Esperança - Zequinha
 2001 - Porto dos Milagres - Gumercindo Vieira (Guma)
 1999 - Andando nas Nuvens - Chico Mota
 1998 - Torre de Babel - Alexandre Leme Toledo
 1996 - Salsa e Merengue - Valentim
 1995 - Irmãos Coragem - João Coragem
 1993 - Renascer - João Pedro
 1991 - Amazônia - Caio 
 1990 - Pantanal - Tadeu 
 1988 - Vale Tudo - Mário Sérgio

Movies 
 1968 - Copacabana Me Engana 
 1982 - O Segredo da Múmia .... Marcos Viana
 1984 - Garota Dourada
 1984 - Nunca Fomos Tão Felizes .... Estudante Interno
 1984 - Memoirs of Prison
 1985 - Avaete, Seed of Revenge
 1986 - A Cor do Seu Destino .... Raul
 1986 - Fulaninha
 1986 - Os Trapalhões e o Rei do Futebol
 1986 - Trancado por Dentro .... Cadú
 1987 - Ele, o Boto
 1987 - Leila Diniz
 1987 - Romance da Empregada
 1987 - Um Trem para as Estrelas .... Jacaré
 1988 - Dedé Mamata .... Alpino
 1990 - Barrela: Escola de Crimes.... Tirica
 1990 - Carnaval .... Beto
 1990 - Stelinha .... Eurico
 1991 - Vai Trabalhar, Vagabundo II - A Volta
 1995 - Carlota Joaquina, Princess of Brazil.... Pedro I of Brazil
 1996 - Buena Sorte… Edgar
 1997 - Anahy de las Misiones…Solano
 1997 - O Amor Está no Ar .... Carlos Henrique
 1998 - Como Ser Solteiro .... Julinho
 2000 - Villa-Lobos - Uma Vida de Paixão .... Heitor Villa-Lobos
 2001 - O Casamento de Louise .... Bugre
 2003 - Dom .... Bentinho
 2003 - Oswaldo Cruz - O Médico do Brasil.... Oswaldo Cruz
 2007 - O Tablado e Maria Clara Machado
 2007 - O Homem Que Desafiou o Diabo.... Zé Araújo / Ojuara
 2008 - A Mulher do meu Amigo.... Thales
 2009 - Quase um Tango....... Batavo
 2009 - Bela Noite para Voar.... Carlos Lacerda
 2012 - E Aí... Comeu?
 2013 - Vendo ou Alugo.... Jorge
 2014 - Os Homens São de Marte... E é pra Lá que Eu Vou! .... Tom
 2014 - A Noite da Virada 
 2016 - The Jungle Book .... Balu (voice)

TV Series 
 2006 - Mandrake - Mandrake (Series - HBO)
 2019 - A Divisão

Theater 
 1981 - O Diamante do Grão Mongol
 1982 - Os Meninos da Rua Paulo
 1984 - Maria Minhoca
 1984 - Chapetuba Futebol Clube … Zito
 1986 - Uma Lição Longe Demais … Valente
 1987 - Ligações Perigosas - Danceny
 1993 - Othello … Othello
 1999 - Diário Secreto de Adão e Eva… Adão
 2000 - Mais Uma Vez Amor … Rodrigo
 2007 - Auto de Anjicos … Lampião

References

External links
 
 Official website

1963 births
Living people
Male actors from Rio de Janeiro (city)
Brazilian male television actors
Brazilian male telenovela actors
20th-century Brazilian male actors
21st-century Brazilian male actors